The men's competition in 85 kg division was staged on September 21–22, 2007.

Schedule

Medalists

Records

Results

New records

References
Results 

Men's 85